State Road 202 (SR 202) is a  state highway that extends from U.S. Route 1 (US 1; Philips Highway), in Jacksonville, Florida to SR A1A (Third Street), in Jacksonville Beach, near the Atlantic Ocean, just north of Ponte Vedra Beach, and includes a bridge over the Intracoastal Waterway. To locals, the road is better known as J. Turner Butler Boulevard, Butler Boulevard, or JTB. Except for a  section from US 1 to Interstate 95 (I-95), it is a completely limited-access expressway. It was constructed in sections by the Jacksonville Transportation Authority (before 1971, the Jacksonville Expressway Authority). The first section opened in 1979, but the entire road was not completed until 1997.

Route description
SR 202 begins at US 1 (Philips Highway) and starts its run east as a divided, six lane surface street, going east towards I-95 and becoming a freeway, passing through mostly marshland as it heads east towards exits including SR 115 (Southside Boulevard) and I-295 (East beltway), before ending at SR A1A, just west of the Atlantic coastline.

Points of interest 
St. Johns Town Center, a super-regional shopping mall is located near the I-295 intersection, as is the University of North Florida. Further east, Mayo Clinic Florida is located near the intersection with San Pablo Road.

History
The expressway is named for J. Turner Butler, a well-known Jacksonville attorney and Florida legislator who was instrumental in advancing various transportation projects in the region and the establishment of the Jacksonville Expressway Authority. J.T.B. was a toll road until 1988 when the JTA removed all the toll-collection facilities in Jacksonville.

When J.T.B. initially opened, it was described by locals as "the road to nowhere". The moniker has diminished over the years as increased growth in Jacksonville's Southside area, as well as at the beaches in St. Johns County, has transformed the road into a major commuter route. Because of the heavy traffic on J.T.B. and projected continued growth in the Jacksonville area, the Florida Department of Transportation, in the early 2000s, conducted a study on making long-term improvements to J.T.B. The study results recommended widening the road and designating "inside" express lanes with limited on and off points along the route, surrounded by additional "outside" local lanes, albeit at a considerable cost. While this was not implemented, most of the highway between I-95 and the Intracoastal Waterway was widened to three to five lanes in each direction in the early-to-mid 2000s.

The Arthur Sollee bridge spans the Intracoastal Waterway and is known by locals as the "Whubba Whubba" bridge, due to defects in construction that make for an amusing bouncy ride on the eastbound side of the roadway.

Between the summer of 2005 and December 24, 2008, an $80 million freeway-to-freeway turbine interchange was constructed at the interchange of J.T.B. and I-295, with the final piece to open being a flyover ramp from J.T.B. east to I-295 north.

Until late 2017, access to J.T.B eastbound from I-95 southbound was handled through a traffic-signaled intersection that was located near the highway's western end. This configuration created significant congestion during rush-hours, causing traffic to back-up onto I-95. To alleviate this situation, a flyover was constructed during the mid-2010s from I-95 southbound to J.T.B eastbound, along with other improvements to the I-95/J.T.B/Belfort Road/Salisbury Road interchanges. Under this new configuration, the signaled intersection remained in place but is now only used to provide access from I-95 to the Belfort/Salisbury/Southpoint commercial area since the new flyover merges into J.T.B eastbound past the existing off-ramps in the Belfort/Salisbury interchange.

In 2022 work was completed to reconfigure the San Pablo Road interchange to a diverging diamond interchange format (with right-in/right-out access to Mayo Clinic).

Improvements
In late 2022 construction began on a loop ramp in the southeast quadrant of the Kernan Blvd. interchange that will replace the existing traffic light for eastbound J.T.B traffic headed to northbound Kernan Blvd.

Exit list

References

202
202
202
Former toll roads in Florida
Expressways in Duval County, Florida